Schlieper may refer to

Ana Rosa Schlieper de Martínez Guerrero
Carl Schlieper
Carlos Schlieper
Franz Schlieper
Fritz Schlieper
Schlieper Bay